D. C. Jefferson (born May 7, 1989) is a former American football tight end. He played college football at Rutgers University. He was drafted in the seventh round with the 219th overall pick by the Arizona Cardinals in the 2013 NFL Draft. Jefferson was released on November 4, 2013 after he was arrested on suspicion of driving under the influence.

References

External links
Rutgers Scarlet Knights bio
Arizona Cardinals bio
Carolina Panthers bio

Living people
1989 births
American football tight ends
Arizona Cardinals players
Carolina Panthers players
Players of American football from Florida
Rutgers Scarlet Knights football players
Sportspeople from Winter Haven, Florida